Fui Vakapuna  (pronounced foo-ē vac-uh-poo-nǎ; born March 9, 1984) is a former American football fullback. He was drafted by the Cincinnati Bengals in the seventh round of the 2009 NFL Draft. He played college football at Brigham Young.

Professional career

Cincinnati Bengals
His attempt to make the Bengals' roster was chronicled on the HBO series Hard Knocks: Training Camp with the Cincinnati Bengals. Vakapuna was released by the Bengals after the preseason and signed to the Arizona Cardinals practice squad. On November 3, 2009 the Bengals re-signed him to their 53-man roster.

New York Jets
Vakapuna was signed by the New York Jets on May 23, 2012. He was waived with an injury settlement on August 1, 2012.

Personal
He is a member of the Church of Jesus Christ of Latter-day Saints; he served a mission in the Carlsbad, California area from 2004 until early spring 2006. Vakapuna is a cousin to former Vikings Fullback Naufahu Tahi. Vakapuna married Leonne Hunkin on July 11, 2009.

Vakapuna has served as the Assistant to the Athletic Director for Student Services at Brigham Young University after his playing days concluded beginning in 2013.

References

External links
New York Jets bio
Cincinnati Bengals bio
Brigham Young bio

1984 births
Living people
People from Kane County, Utah
Players of American football from Salt Lake City
American Latter Day Saints
BYU Cougars football players
Cincinnati Bengals players
Arizona Cardinals players
Indianapolis Colts players
New York Jets players
American people of Tongan descent
American Mormon missionaries in the United States
21st-century Mormon missionaries